The Best Band in the Land is the third and final studio album of CCS. It was recorded at Abbey Road Studios in London, January to May 1973 and released in September that year. In Australia, the album was titled The Band Played the Boogie.

The album includes covers of songs by The Kinks and Cream amongst others, and it is equally split with original compositions. The style continues that of their previous two albums, with heavy rock and blues songs arranged with jazz instruments. The single "The Band Played the Boogie" charted as high as number 36 on the UK Official Charts. Neither the album or single charted in the US.

Track listing

Side one
 "The Band Played the Boogie" (Don Reedman, Jeff Jarrett, John Cameron) – 3:49
 "Wild Witch Lady" (Donovan Leitch) – 4:00
 "Lola" (Ray Davies) – 3:35
 "Primitive Love" (Mike Chapman, Nicky Chinn) – 3:15
 "Hundred Highways" (Cameron) – 3:49

Side two
 "Shakin' All Over" (Frederick Heath) – 3:08
 "Memphis" (Cameron) – 3:40 
 "Sunshine of Your Love" (Jack Bruce, Pete Brown, Eric Clapton) – 3:39
 "Our Man in London" (Cameron) – 2:22
 "Cannibal Sheep" (Alexis Korner) – 3:35

Personnel

Musicians
 Alexis Korner – vocals
 Peter Thorup – vocals
 John Cameron – electric piano, conductor
 Alan Parker – electric guitar
 Herbie Flowers – bass
 Spike Heatley – string bass
 Tony Carr, Barry Morgan – drums
 Jim Lawless, Bill Le Sage – percussion
 Harold Beckett, Henry Lowther, Greg Bowen, Tony Fisher, Les Condon, Kenny Wheeler – trumpet
 Don Lusher, John Marshall, Brain Perrin, Bill Geldard – trombone
 Neil Sanders – horn
 Harold McNair, Tony Coe, Pete King, Danny Moss, Bob Efford, Ron Ross – saxophones, woodwinds

Technical
 Mickie Most – producer
 Mike Bobak, Guy Bidmead – engineers

References

1973 albums
CCS (band) albums
Albums conducted by John Cameron (musician)
Albums produced by Mickie Most
Rak Records albums